Clarksburg High School is a public high school located at 22500 Wims Road in Clarksburg, Maryland. It is part of the Montgomery County Public Schools system, Maryland's largest public school system. The school is named after the community in which it is located. Its students mainly come from Rocky Hill Middle School, Hallie Wells Middle School and Neelsville Middle School.

History
The building that currently houses Clarksburg High School originally housed the Rocky Hill Middle School until 2004, when a new building for the latter was inaugurated a short distance from it.

Administration 
The current principal of Clarksburg High School is Edward K. Owusu. Prior to his appointment in 2017, Owusu was the principal of Shady Grove Middle School, as well as the principal intern and assistant principal at Thomas S. Wootton High School.

Academics
39.7% of the Class of 2015 scored a 3 or higher on at least one AP exam. The average SAT composite score for the 2014–15 school year was 1089, compared to the county average of 1126 and the national average of 1060.

Campus

Increasing enrollment forced Clarksburg to install four portable classrooms for the 2008–09 school year. The first four portables were located on a parking lot, outside of the main gymnasium, near the back athletic fields.  Four more portables were installed for the 2010–11 school year. These classrooms were installed atop two blacktop areas paved for basketball near the student parking lot (on the opposite side of the school as the initial relocatable classrooms). The social studies department currently occupies these portable classrooms.  During the 2011–12 school year, Clarksburg was forced to install two more portables, overtaking yet another blacktop area.  A new wing was built and completed prior to the 2014–15 school year. The lower floor of this wing is used by foreign language courses, while the top floor hosts a few science classes.

Students 
The student body of the 2015–2016 school year was 22.7% non-Hispanic White, 18.4% Asian, 28% African American, 26.6% Hispanic/Latino, less than 5% American Indian, less than 5% Pacific Islander, and less than 5% of mixed race.

School day
The Clarksburg High School instructional day runs from the warning bell at 7:40, the class bell at 7:45, and the dismissal bell at 2:30. Classes run approximately 47 minutes on an average day with five minutes of transition time.

Graduation
Clarksburg High School seniors have graduated at the Knott Auditorium on the campus of Mount Saint Mary's University since the school's opening.

Programs

APPS program
One of Clarksburg's programs is the four-year Advanced Placement Power Scholars program (APPS). Students can apply for the program during eighth or ninth grade. Modeled after Walter Johnson High School's APEX Program, the APPS program requires its members to take a rigorous number of Advanced Placement classes.  By the end of a member's senior year, they will have taken at least 6 AP classes, and will have taken the classes' respective exams distributed by the College Board. The sponsor of the group is Signature Program Coordinator Sarah Costlow.

APPS students take AP US Government their freshman year, AP US History their sophomore year, and more AP classes their junior and senior years. Many take AP English Language and Composition and AP World History as juniors.

P-TECH program
The Pathways in Network and Information Technology Program (P-TECH) is a dual enrollment program that enables participating students to earn both a MCPS high school diploma and an Associate of Applied Science (AAS) degree from Montgomery College for FREE while in high school.  Both degrees must be completed within a maximum of six years or less.  The AAS degree will ensure that students will meet industry expectations and gain technical skills and workplace competencies as well as industry certifications.  Certifications will be earned in microcomputer technician and network administration in either Microsoft or Cisco or in wireless technologies.  Additionally, the program will afford participating students mentoring and a paid summer employment opportunity within the technical industry in Montgomery County. To ensure that all participating students meet the challenges of this program, students will participate in a summer bridge program every summer including the summer before they enter grade 9, but excluding the summer of their paid work experience assignments.  Completion of this program guarantees students “first in-line” status for consideration of job opportunities with the program’s IT business partners.

CHStage
CHStage is the award-winning drama department at Clarksburg High School. Two shows, at least one a musical, are produced each year and have included Tarzan, Once Upon a Mattress, The Little Princess, In The Heights, and The Little Mermaid.  Each year CHStage attends theater festivals throughout Maryland, and has won awards at every festival they have attended since 2008.

Honor societies 
Clarksburg offers students the chance to participate in the National Honor Society (NHS), Science National Honor Society, Spanish National Honor Society, Tri-M Music Honor Society, International Thespian Society, and the National Art Honor Society.

The Howl 
The Howl, Clarksburg High School's student-run newspaper, is produced by a small but growing group of student writers and editors.

Youth & Government 
Youth & Government is a mock student government club run by the YMCA. Its members participate in roles of government, such as the legislature and bureaucracy as lobbyists, and are also offered the roles of attorneys and members of the press. Delegates attend an annual conference in Annapolis and are among 20,000 students across the United States affiliated with the program.

InvenTeam 
The Clarksburg High School InvenTeam is one of 16 high school teams in the nation to receive grant funding from the Massachusetts Institute of Technology (MIT). The team presented its TorchCord invention at the March Madness for the Mind event in the National Museum of American History, part of the National Collegiate Inventors and Innovators Alliance's 13th annual meeting in Washington, DC. The team also traveled to MIT for the Lemelson-MIT EurekaFest event in 2009, having created a pressure-sensitive illuminated computer cable. Sarah Debelius Costlow, the Signature Program Coordinator, and Paul Koda, a science teacher, sponsored the team.

Marching Band 
The Clarksburg High School Marching Band, better known as "The Spirit of Clarksburg” is a competitive corps-style marching ensemble.

Notable accomplishments of The Spirit of Clarksburg include performances in Shanghai, China, performing in the Shanghai Tourism Festival Parade at the beginning of the 2009–2010 school year, as well as in the National Cherry Blossom Festival Parade in Washington, D.C. in 2012. They also annually attend the locally televised Montgomery County Thanksgiving Parade in Silver Spring, MD every November.

The Spirit of Clarksburg marching band became the 2019 Tournament of Bands Region 5 Class 3A Champions on October 19, 2019, with their 2019 program "Rise of the Phoenix". In the State Finals of the 2019 MMBA (Maryland Marching Band Association) season at Towson University, they placed 5th place against various other bands in the 3A Class.

The Clarksburg High School Marching Band also participates in many different events throughout the school and local community. They perform during school pep rallies and during football games at Coyote Canyon, in the stands as well as during half-time. In events such as CSA/Middle School Band Night, the Spirit of Clarksburg works to extend outreach to and inspire students from feeder middles schools, like Rocky Hill or Hallie Wells Middle Schools.

The Clarksburg High School Marching Band also includes the Clarksburg Majorettes who performs alongside the band at football games and competitions.

Athletics

Soccer
The boys' soccer team, coached by Jeremiah Spoales, won the state championship for the 2009 season.  The girls' soccer team is coached by English teacher Christina Mann, a former Montgomery County standout soccer player who went on to play Division I NCAA women's soccer at North Carolina State University.

Track and field

The 2006–2007 outdoor track and field team had a very successful season with the boys ending with 4 wins and 1 loss for the regular season and the girls' team ending their regular season with 3 wins and 2 losses. It also sent many athletes to the Maryland State Championships despite the lack of a senior class.

The 2007–2008 outdoor track and field team had another very successful season with the boys ending with 6 wins and 0 losses for the regular season and the girls' team ending their regular season with 6 wins and 0 losses.

The 2008-2009 boys' indoor track team finished second in both the Montgomery County Championship and the 2A Region Championship.

The 2008–2009 outdoor track team ended the year with an undefeated 6–0 record once again. Both the boys and the girls won the division. In the County Championship, the boys placed second while the girls placed third. The boys won the 2A West Region while the girls placed second. In the state competition, the boys finished first and became the school's first-ever state championship team.

The 2010-2011 girls' indoor track team took third at the county championship, and second at the 3A West championship.

The 2010-2011 girls took second at the 3A West Championship while the boys finished third. The 2014-15 girls' indoor track team took first place in the county, 4A West championship, and 4A State championship meets. The 2015 girls' outdoor track took also took first place in the county, 4A West championship, and 4A State championship meets.

Cross country
In the 2007–2008 cross country season the boys' and girls' teams became Division III Champions with records of 5–0.

References

External links
 
 The school paper's website

Educational institutions established in 2006
Public high schools in Montgomery County, Maryland
2006 establishments in Maryland